
Gmina Czarnożyły is a rural gmina (administrative district) in Wieluń County, Łódź Voivodeship, in central Poland.

Villages
Gmina Czarnożyły contains the villages and settlements of Czarnożyły, Działy, Emanuelina, Gromadzice, Kąty, Łagiewniki, Leniszki, Opojowice, Platoń, Raczyn, Staw, Stawek and Wydrzyn.

Neighbouring gminas
Gmina Czarnożyły is bordered by the gminas of Biała, Lututów, Ostrówek and Wieluń.

References
Polish official population figures 2006

Czarnozyly
Wieluń County